The 1997 Anchorage mayoral election was held on April 15, 1997, to elect the mayor of Anchorage, Alaska. It saw reelection Currety of Rick Mystrom.

Since at least one candidate (in this instance, two candidates) obtained 40% of the vote, no runoff was needed.

Candidates
Jason Bean
Alan B. Carraway
Thomas M. Elam
Robert "Robert F." Felder
Tom Fink, former mayor
Georgia Mario
Andree McLeod
Rick Mystrom, incumbent mayor
Otto A. Schneider
William J. "Bill" Terbeck

Results

References 

Anchorage
Anchorage 
1997